Silvester Shkalla (born 10 August 1995) is an Albanian professional footballer who plays as a centre back for Albanian club KS Kastrioti Krujë in the Albanian Superliga.

Club career

Early career
Shkalla started his youth career at Shkëndija Tiranë. After spending 3 years there he moved at Dinamo Tirana.

Teuta Durrës
In July 2015, Shkalla signed a three-year contract with Albanian Superliga side Teuta Durrës for an undisclosed fee. He was given the number 3, which was vacant after the departure of Elvis Prençi.

Shkalla made his top flight debut on 22 August 2015 in team's opening match of the season against Flamurtari Vlorë, where he played full-90 minutes in a 1–0 away triumph. He played full-90 minutes in both legs of the first round of 2015–16 Albanian Cup, where Teuta thrashed Ada Velipojë with the aggregate 11–2.

On 21 October, in the first round of the second leg against Kamza, Shkalla scored his first goal for Teuta, a winner, which helped the team to win the match 0–1. After the match, he told the media that he has very happy for the goal and more happy for the fact that the team won thanks to his goal.

International career

Albania U-21

2017 UEFA Euro U-21 Championship
Shkalla was called up at the Albania national under-21 football team by coach Redi Jupi during the 2017 UEFA European Under-21 Championship qualification between October and November 2015 where he was an unused substitute in 3 matches played by Albania U21. After almost 1-year absence he was returned again at Albania U21 and played as a starter in a match against Greece U21 on 2 September 2016. In the 41st minute Shkalla made a bad tackle against an opponent player and this caused to receive a Yellow card and then following a controversial physical attack directed to him by opponent's players, referee gave Shkalla a Red card to send him off.

Career statistics

Clubs

References

External links
Silvester Shkalla profile FSHF.org

Silvester Shkalla profile at Football DataBase

1995 births
Living people
Footballers from Tirana
Albanian footballers
Association football defenders
Shkëndija Tiranë players
FK Dinamo Tirana players
KF Teuta Durrës players
KF Bylis players
KS Kastrioti players
Kategoria e Parë players
Kategoria Superiore players
Albania youth international footballers
Albania under-21 international footballers